The Sergiyev Posad constituency (No.125) is a Russian legislative constituency in Moscow Oblast. The constituency covers northeastern Moscow Oblast. Pushkino constituency was created in 1995 from parts of Noginsk and Shchyolkovo constituencies. The present day Sergiyev Posad constituency was created from nearly half of Pushkino constituency and Sergiyevo-Posadsky District (part of Dmitrov constituency).

Members elected

Election results

1995

|-
! colspan=2 style="background-color:#E9E9E9;text-align:left;vertical-align:top;" |Candidate
! style="background-color:#E9E9E9;text-align:left;vertical-align:top;" |Party
! style="background-color:#E9E9E9;text-align:right;" |Votes
! style="background-color:#E9E9E9;text-align:right;" |%
|-
|style="background-color:"|
|align=left|Svetlana Savitskaya
|align=left|Communist Party
|
|23.16%
|-
|style="background-color:"|
|align=left|Aleksey Zakharov
|align=left|Yabloko
|
|11.45%
|-
|style="background-color:"|
|align=left|Vladimir Kurtashin
|align=left|Our Home – Russia
|
|8.50%
|-
|style="background-color:#E98282"|
|align=left|Valentina Martynova
|align=left|Women of Russia
|
|5.83%
|-
|style="background-color:#2C299A"|
|align=left|Anatoly Voronin
|align=left|Congress of Russian Communities
|
|4.98%
|-
|style="background-color:"|
|align=left|Vyacheslav Kiselyov
|align=left|Liberal Democratic Party
|
|4.56%
|-
|style="background-color:"|
|align=left|Vladimir Grishin
|align=left|Independent
|
|3.89%
|-
|style="background-color:"|
|align=left|Stanislav Smirnov
|align=left|Independent
|
|3.80%
|-
|style="background-color:"|
|align=left|Cheslav Mlynnik
|align=left|Union of Communists
|
|3.31%
|-
|style="background-color:"|
|align=left|Anatoly Lobanov
|align=left|Independent
|
|2.40%
|-
|style="background-color:"|
|align=left|Vitaly Lagutin
|align=left|Independent
|
|2.08%
|-
|style="background-color:#3A46CE"|
|align=left|Zakhid Godzhayev
|align=left|Democratic Choice of Russia – United Democrats
|
|1.93%
|-
|style="background-color:"|
|align=left|Viktor Semyonov
|align=left|Independent
|
|1.90%
|-
|style="background-color:"|
|align=left|Igor Kravchenko
|align=left|Independent
|
|1.72%
|-
|style="background-color:"|
|align=left|Mikhail Sinitsyn
|align=left|Independent
|
|1.65%
|-
|style="background-color:"|
|align=left|Aleksandr Lobko
|align=left|League of Independent Scientists
|
|1.38%
|-
|style="background-color:#C28314"|
|align=left|Gennady Korsunov
|align=left|For the Motherland!
|
|1.33%
|-
|style="background-color:"|
|align=left|Aleksandr Belunik
|align=left|Independent
|
|1.33%
|-
|style="background-color:#000000"|
|colspan=2 |against all
|
|11.82%
|-
| colspan="5" style="background-color:#E9E9E9;"|
|- style="font-weight:bold"
| colspan="3" style="text-align:left;" | Total
| 
| 100%
|-
| colspan="5" style="background-color:#E9E9E9;"|
|- style="font-weight:bold"
| colspan="4" |Source:
|
|}

1999

|-
! colspan=2 style="background-color:#E9E9E9;text-align:left;vertical-align:top;" |Candidate
! style="background-color:#E9E9E9;text-align:left;vertical-align:top;" |Party
! style="background-color:#E9E9E9;text-align:right;" |Votes
! style="background-color:#E9E9E9;text-align:right;" |%
|-
|style="background-color:"|
|align=left|Svetlana Savitskaya (incumbent)
|align=left|Communist Party
|
|22.28%
|-
|style="background-color:#020266"|
|align=left|Igor Bryntsalov
|align=left|Russian Socialist Party
|
|22.11%
|-
|style="background-color:"|
|align=left|Yevgeny Parkhayev
|align=left|Independent
|
|14.91%
|-
|style="background-color:"|
|align=left|Vladimir Ispravnikov
|align=left|Independent
|
|8.61%
|-
|style="background-color:"|
|align=left|Arkady Tsukanov
|align=left|Independent
|
|3.64%
|-
|style="background-color:"|
|align=left|Yury Grishin
|align=left|Independent
|
|3.42%
|-
|style="background-color:"|
|align=left|Vyacheslav Savinov
|align=left|Unity
|
|3.32%
|-
|style="background-color:"|
|align=left|Viktor Aksyuchits
|align=left|Independent
|
|1.54%
|-
|style="background-color:#E2CA66"|
|align=left|Aleksandr Lobko
|align=left|For Civil Dignity
|
|1.12%
|-
|style="background-color:#8A8A8A"|
|align=left|Aleksey Vedenkin
|align=left|Russian Patriotic Popular Movement
|
|1.03%
|-
|style="background-color:"|
|align=left|Vladimir Feofanov
|align=left|Independent
|
|0.93%
|-
|style="background-color:#FCCA19"|
|align=left|Ivan Prikhodchenko
|align=left|Congress of Russian Communities-Yury Boldyrev Movement
|
|0.91%
|-
|style="background-color:#000000"|
|colspan=2 |against all
|
|14.01%
|-
| colspan="5" style="background-color:#E9E9E9;"|
|- style="font-weight:bold"
| colspan="3" style="text-align:left;" | Total
| 
| 100%
|-
| colspan="5" style="background-color:#E9E9E9;"|
|- style="font-weight:bold"
| colspan="4" |Source:
|
|}

2003

|-
! colspan=2 style="background-color:#E9E9E9;text-align:left;vertical-align:top;" |Candidate
! style="background-color:#E9E9E9;text-align:left;vertical-align:top;" |Party
! style="background-color:#E9E9E9;text-align:right;" |Votes
! style="background-color:#E9E9E9;text-align:right;" |%
|-
|style="background-color:"|
|align=left|Dmitry Sablin
|align=left|United Russia
|
|53.99%
|-
|style="background-color:"|
|align=left|Svetlana Savitskaya (incumbent)
|align=left|Communist Party
|
|12.85%
|-
|style="background-color:"|
|align=left|Svetlana Savitskaya
|align=left|Independent
|
|3.84%
|-
|style="background-color:"|
|align=left|Andrey Golovatyuk
|align=left|Liberal Democratic Party
|
|2.57%
|-
|style="background-color:"|
|align=left|Aleksandr Nikolayev
|align=left|The Greens
|
|2.09%
|-
|style="background-color:#164C8C"|
|align=left|Anatoly Pchelintsev
|align=left|United Russian Party Rus'
|
|2.06%
|-
|style="background-color:#00A1FF"|
|align=left|Sergey Yefremov
|align=left|Party of Russia's Rebirth-Russian Party of Life
|
|1.63%
|-
|style="background-color:"|
|align=left|Yury Mishin
|align=left|Creation
|
|1.58%
|-
|style="background-color:#000000"|
|colspan=2 |against all
|
|16.24%
|-
| colspan="5" style="background-color:#E9E9E9;"|
|- style="font-weight:bold"
| colspan="3" style="text-align:left;" | Total
| 
| 100%
|-
| colspan="5" style="background-color:#E9E9E9;"|
|- style="font-weight:bold"
| colspan="4" |Source:
|
|}

2016

|-
! colspan=2 style="background-color:#E9E9E9;text-align:left;vertical-align:top;" |Candidate
! style="background-color:#E9E9E9;text-align:left;vertical-align:top;" |Party
! style="background-color:#E9E9E9;text-align:right;" |Votes
! style="background-color:#E9E9E9;text-align:right;" |%
|-
|style="background-color: " |
|align=left|Sergey Pakhomov
|align=left|United Russia
|
|47.39%
|-
|style="background-color:"|
|align=left|Anastasia Preobrazhenskaya
|align=left|Communist Party
|
|12.87%
|-
|style="background-color:"|
|align=left|Ivan Petrov
|align=left|Liberal Democratic Party
|
|8.82%
|-
|style="background-color:"|
|align=left|Sergey Kryzhov
|align=left|Yabloko
|
|5.00%
|-
|style="background-color:"|
|align=left|Vyacheslav Kovtun
|align=left|A Just Russia
|
|4.97%
|-
|style="background:"| 
|align=left|Andrey Shalnev
|align=left|People's Freedom Party
|
|4.78%
|-
|style="background:"| 
|align=left|Olga Boldyreva
|align=left|Communists of Russia
|
|4.77%
|-
|style="background:"| 
|align=left|Tatyana Gorovets
|align=left|Party of Growth
|
|2.98%
|-
|style="background-color:"|
|align=left|Valery Kubarev
|align=left|The Greens
|
|1.97%
|-
|style="background:"| 
|align=left|Vladimir Bobrovnik
|align=left|Patriots of Russia
|
|1.67%
|-
| colspan="5" style="background-color:#E9E9E9;"|
|- style="font-weight:bold"
| colspan="3" style="text-align:left;" | Total
| 
| 100%
|-
| colspan="5" style="background-color:#E9E9E9;"|
|- style="font-weight:bold"
| colspan="4" |Source:
|
|}

2021

|-
! colspan=2 style="background-color:#E9E9E9;text-align:left;vertical-align:top;" |Candidate
! style="background-color:#E9E9E9;text-align:left;vertical-align:top;" |Party
! style="background-color:#E9E9E9;text-align:right;" |Votes
! style="background-color:#E9E9E9;text-align:right;" |%
|-
|style="background-color:"|
|align=left|Sergey Pakhomov (incumbent)
|align=left|United Russia
|
|45.00%
|-
|style="background-color:"|
|align=left|Andrey Mardasov
|align=left|A Just Russia — For Truth
|
|14.46%
|-
|style="background-color:"|
|align=left|Tatyana Ordynskaya
|align=left|Communist Party
|
|14.31%
|-
|style="background-color: " |
|align=left|Marianna Grigorovich
|align=left|New People
|
|4.40%
|-
|style="background-color: "|
|align=left|Svetlana Li
|align=left|Party of Pensioners
|
|4.24%
|-
|style="background-color:"|
|align=left|Eduard Perebikovsky
|align=left|Liberal Democratic Party
|
|4.16%
|-
|style="background-color:"|
|align=left|Sergey Zakharov
|align=left|Rodina
|
|3.66%
|-
|style="background-color:"|
|align=left|Sergey Kryzhov
|align=left|Yabloko
|
|2.57%
|-
|style="background-color:"|
|align=left|Mikhail Pogrebnoy
|align=left|The Greens
|
|1.94%
|-
|style="background:"| 
|align=left|Valery Kyshev
|align=left|Party of Growth
|
|1.20%
|-
| colspan="5" style="background-color:#E9E9E9;"|
|- style="font-weight:bold"
| colspan="3" style="text-align:left;" | Total
| 
| 100%
|-
| colspan="5" style="background-color:#E9E9E9;"|
|- style="font-weight:bold"
| colspan="4" |Source:
|
|}

Notes

References

Russian legislative constituencies
Politics of Moscow Oblast